Ivan Konstantinovich Shablyuyev (Russian: Иван Константинович Шаблюев; born 17 April 1988) is a Russian hurdler. He competed in the 400 metres hurdles event at the 2015 World Championships in Beijing without qualifying for the semifinals. In addition he won a bronze medal at the 2015 Summer Universiade.

His personal best in the event is 49.04 seconds set at the Universiade in Gwangju in 2015.

Competition record

See also
 Russia at the 2015 World Championships in Athletics

References

External links 

Russian male hurdlers
Living people
Place of birth missing (living people)
1988 births
World Athletics Championships athletes for Russia
Competitors at the 2013 Summer Universiade
Medalists at the 2015 Summer Universiade
Universiade medalists in athletics (track and field)
Universiade bronze medalists for Russia